Blessed Be Thy Name may refer to:

"Blessed Be Thy Name", a hymn by William J. Kirkpatrick (1838–1921)
"Blessed Be Thy Name", a composition by Thomas Tallis (c. 1505–1585)

See also
Hallowed Be Thy Name (disambiguation)
Blessed Be Your Name (disambiguation)